Cradle Song is a 1933 American pre-Code drama film directed by Mitchell Leisen, released by Paramount Pictures, and starring Dorothea Wieck and Evelyn Venable. It is based on the 1911 play of the same name by Gregorio Martínez Sierra.

Cradle Song was Dorothea Wieck's first American film.

Cast
Dorothea Wieck as Joanna
Evelyn Venable as Teresa
Guy Standing as Doctor
Louise Dresser as Prioress
Kent Taylor as Antonio
Gertrude Michael as Marcella
Georgia Caine as Vicaress
Dickie Moore as Alberto
Nydia Westman as Sagrario
Marion Ballou as Ines
Eleanor Wesselhoeft as Mistress of Novices
Gail Patrick as Maria Lucia
Howard Lang as Mayor
Diane Sinclair as Christina
Gertrude Norman as Tornero No. 1
Dorothy Vernon as Nun

Reception
The film was a box office disappointment for Paramount.

References

External links

1933 films
Films directed by Mitchell Leisen
American black-and-white films
American films based on plays
1933 drama films
American drama films
1930s English-language films
1930s American films